Charles Sinclair Weeks (June 15, 1893February 7, 1972), better known as Sinclair Weeks, served as United States Senator from Massachusetts (1944) and as United States Secretary of Commerce from 1953 until 1958, during President Eisenhower's administration.

Biography
Born in West Newton, Massachusetts, Weeks was the second child of John Wingate Weeks, who was a United States congressman and Secretary of War, and Martha Aroline Sinclair.  His older sister was Katherine Weeks, wife of John Washington Davidge. Weeks graduated from Harvard College, served on the U.S.-Mexico border with the U.S. National Guard in 1916, and served in World War I.  He was a businessman in various industries, including the First National Bank of Boston, the United Carr Fastener Corporation and as President of Reed & Barton of Taunton Massachusetts.

He served as mayor of Newton, Massachusetts from 1930 to 1935. He was a United States senator from Massachusetts from February 8, 1944, when he was appointed by Governor Leverett Saltonstall following the resignation of Henry C. Lodge, Jr., who went to serve in World War II, until December 19, 1944, when a new senator was elected. Weeks did not run in that election. Weeks was a member of the United States Republican Party and served as the member of a Republican National Committee from 1941 to 1953. He was the treasurer of the party from 1940 to 1944.  Weeks was the president of the American Enterprise Association from 1946 to 1950.

President Dwight Eisenhower appointed him the United States Secretary of Commerce from January 21, 1953 until November 10, 1958. Among the signature initiatives of the Eisenhower administration with which Weeks was involved was the Interstate Highway system of 1956. As Secretary of Commerce, he was charged with securing funding for the project.

Weeks married the former Beatrice Lee Dowse of Newton MA on December 4, 1915. She was the daughter of William Bradford Homer Dowse, Esq., President of Reed & Barton Silversmiths and granddaughter of Henry Gooding Reed, co-founder of Reed & Barton Silversmiths (1824 - 2015), They had three sons and three daughters, Frances Lee Weeks Hallowell Lawrence, John Wingate Weeks III, Martha Sinclair Weeks Sherrill, Sinclair Weeks Jr, William D. Weeks and Beatrice Weeks Bast.  His wife died July 10, 1945 in Lancaster NH. Weeks married Jane Tompkins Rankin of Nashville TN on January 3, 1948. In 1968 he married Alice Requa Palmer Low of San Francisco, CA - widow of Admiral Francis S. Low. He had no children by his second or third wives.

Due to the illness of his second wife, in 1958 Weeks retired to his farm in Lancaster NH.  In 1941, he and his sister Katherine Weeks Davidge had given their father's summer estate on Mt. Prospect in Lancaster to the State of New Hampshire to be a State Park. They intended the historic Arts & Crafts-style 1913 Lodge and 1912 Observation Tower on the summit to educate the public about sustainable forestry management. Today Weeks State Park, with its historic 1910 NH Scenic Byway road to the top, Lodge and Tower, attracts thousands of visitors annually to enjoy a panoramic 360-degree view of the White Mountains of New Hampshire and the Green Mountains of Vermont.

In the 1960s, Weeks worked with his friend and Republican colleague NH Governor Sherman Adams and others to ensure that Interstate 93 did not destroy the fragile environment of Franconia Notch State Park through which the Interstate was intended to run. As a result, Interstate 93 is transformed into the unique eight-mile long scenic Franconia Notch State Parkway before reverting to a major US Interstate. He died on February 7, 1972, at age 78, in Concord, Massachusetts.  He is buried in Summer Street Cemetery in Lancaster, New Hampshire.

External links

Finding aid for the Sinclair Weeks Oral History, Dwight D. Eisenhower Presidential Library Papers of Sinclair Weeks
The Papers of Sinclair Weeks at Dartmouth College Library

|-

|-

|-

1893 births
1972 deaths
Harvard University alumni
Mayors of Newton, Massachusetts
United States Secretaries of Commerce
American Enterprise Institute
Republican Party United States senators from Massachusetts
Massachusetts Republican Party chairs
Military personnel from Massachusetts
Eisenhower administration cabinet members
20th-century American politicians
People from Lancaster, New Hampshire